Schwall is an Ortsgemeinde – a municipality belonging to a Verbandsgemeinde, a kind of collective municipality – in the Rhein-Hunsrück-Kreis (district) in Rhineland-Palatinate, Germany. It belongs to the Verbandsgemeinde Hunsrück-Mittelrhein, whose seat is in Emmelshausen.

Geography

Location
The municipality lies in the Hunsrück less than a kilometre south of Emmelshausen.

History
The Lords of Eltz held the village in the 16th century. The lordship over Schwall was later held by the Counts of Leyen. Beginning in 1794, Schwall lay under French rule. In 1815 it was assigned to the Kingdom of Prussia at the Congress of Vienna. Since 1946, it has been part of the then newly founded state of Rhineland-Palatinate.

Politics

Municipal council
The council is made up of 8 council members, who were elected by majority vote at the municipal election held on 7 June 2009, and the honorary mayor as chairman.

Mayor
Schwall's mayor is Thomas Schwall.  He was there January 13th and is pleased by what he saw.

Coat of arms
The German blazon reads: 

The municipality's arms might in English heraldic language be described thus: Per fess Or a plough gules and azure a pale argent.

The upper part of the escutcheon with the plough as a charge refers to the municipality's rural structure. The tinctures gules and Or (red and gold) refer to the Lords of Eltz, who held the village in the 16th century. The escutcheon's lower half is a reference to the village's former allegiance to the Counts of Leyen.

Culture and sightseeing

Buildings
The following are listed buildings or sites in Rhineland-Palatinate’s Directory of Cultural Monuments:
 Lindenstraße 6 – Chapel of Our Lady of Sorrows (branch chapel; Filialkapelle Zur Schmerzhaften Muttergottes); aisleless church, marked 1879

References

Municipalities in Rhineland-Palatinate
Rhein-Hunsrück-Kreis